Flight 625 may refer to:

American Airlines Flight 625, crashed on 27 April 1976
Air Mauritanie Flight 625, crashed on 1 July 1994

0625